is a Japanese long jumper.

Personal bests

International competition

References

External links

Rikiya Saruyama at JAAF 

1984 births
Living people
Japanese male long jumpers
Sportspeople from Chiba Prefecture